The meningohypophyseal artery, or meningohypophyseal trunk, is an inconstant branch of the cavernous segment of the internal carotid artery. Classically, the meningohypophyseal artery has three named branches:
Dorsal meningeal artery
Inferior hypophyseal artery
Tentorial artery (artery of Bernasconi and Cassinari, also known as the "Italian" artery)

References

Arteries of the head and neck